Pagan Passions is a 1924 American silent drama film directed by Colin Campbell and starring Wyndham Standing, June Elvidge, and Barbara Bedford.

Plot
As described in a film magazine review, when her husband commits suicide, Dreka Langley leaves her new-born baby with a family in China and falls in love with John Dangerfield, a married man. The two live in the Chinese underworld and Mrs. Dangerfield obtains a divorce. Years later, Dangerfield reforms and seeks seclusion in a Chinese monastery, where he meets and adopts Billy, who is the boy that was deserted by Dreka. Billy is sent to an American college where he meets and falls in love with Shirley, who is Dangerfield's daughter. Billy believes his supposed half-caste nationality is a bar to their marriage, which is removed when Dreka, before dying, identifies Billy as her son. Dangerfield wins back his wife and all ends well.

Cast

Preservation
With no copies of Pagan Passions located in any film archives, it is a lost film.

References

Bibliography
 Goble, Alan. The Complete Index to Literary Sources in Film. Walter de Gruyter, 1999.

External links

1924 films
1924 drama films
1920s English-language films
American silent feature films
Silent American drama films
American black-and-white films
Films directed by Colin Campbell
Selznick Pictures films
1920s American films